Scolecida is an infraclass of polychaete worms. Scolecids are mostly unselective deposit feeders on marine detritus.

Characteristics
Scolecids have parapodia with rami that are all alike. 
The prostomium is distinct. The head has no appendages or palps and is usually conical, though in the Scalibregmatidae, it has a "T"-shaped tip, and in Paraonidae, there is a single, central antenna. In some families there are sometimes some tiny eyespots. The oesophagus is evertable forming a sac-like proboscis which may have several finger-like lobes. The anterior segments and their appendages are all similar. The notopodia and neuropodia consist of unbranched capillary chaetae, sometimes with hooks. There is a single central gill in Cossuridae on an anterior segment and simple segmental gills are present in some other families.

Systematics
The families Arenicolidae, Capitellidae and Maldanidae were formerly part of the order Capitellida. They are now included in infraclass Scolecida along with Cossuridae, Orbiniidae, Opheliidae, Paraonidae and Scalibregmatidae. This clade is probably not a natural grouping and is likely to be revised in the future.

Subdivisions
Family Aeolosomatidae
Family Arenicolidae
Family Capitellidae
Family Cossuridae
Family Maldanidae
Family Opheliidae
Family Orbiniidae
Family Paraonidae
Family Parergodrilidae
Family Potamodrilidae
Family Psammodrilidae
Family Questidae
Family Scalibregmatidae

References

Polychaetes